{{Automatic taxobox
| image = Rhynchotechum discolor yamabiwasw01.jpg
| image_caption = Rhynchotechum discolor
| taxon = Rhynchotechum 
| authority = Blume
| display_parents = 3
| synonyms = * Cheilosandra Griff. ex Lindl.
 Chiliandra Griff.
 Corysanthera Wall. ex Endl.
 Isanthera Nees
}}Rhynchotechum''' is a genus of plants in the family Gesneriaceae, subfamily Didymocarpoideae.
Species distribution records are mostly from India, Sri Lanka, China through to southern Japan, Indo-China and Malesia through to New Guinea.

Species
Plants of the World Online lists:
 Rhynchotechum alternifolium C.B.Clarke
 Rhynchotechum angustifolium Ridl.
 Rhynchotechum brandisii C.B.Clarke
 Rhynchotechum brevipedunculatum J.C.Wang
 Rhynchotechum burmanicum B.M.Anderson
 Rhynchotechum calycinum C.B.Clarke
 Rhynchotechum discolor (Maxim.) B.L.Burtt
 Rhynchotechum ellipticum (Wall. ex D.Dietr.) A.DC.
 Rhynchotechum eximium (C.B.Clarke) Schltr.
 Rhynchotechum formosanum Hatus.
 Rhynchotechum gracile B.M.Anderson
 Rhynchotechum hispidum C.B.Clarke
 Rhynchotechum hookeri (C.B.Clarke) B.M.Anderson
 Rhynchotechum longipes W.T.Wang
 Rhynchotechum obovatum (Griff.) B.L.Burtt
 Rhynchotechum parviflorum Blume
 Rhynchotechum permolle (Nees) B.L.Burtt
 Rhynchotechum polycarpum (K.Schum.) Schltr.
 Rhynchotechum vestitum Wall. ex C.B.Clarke
 Rhynchotechum vietnamense'' B.M.Anderson

References

External links
 
 

Flora of Indo-China
Gesneriaceae genera
Didymocarpoideae
Lamiales of Asia